The following is a timeline of the history of the city of Kumanovo, North Macedonia.

Prehistory 

 Kostoperska karpa settlement established
 Bronze Age Gradiste settlement established
 Neolithic site of Mlado Nagoričane settlement established
 Iron Age tumulus Groblje at Vojnik established

Antic Period 
 600 BC – 217 BC Kumanovo area under Peoninan Kingdom
 (148BC-330AD) Kumanovo area under Roman Empire
 Roman Necropolis Drezga of Lopate established
 Roman Settlement Vicianus at village of Klečovce established

Early Middle Ages 
 (330-836) Kumanovo area under 
 Slavic tribes arrived: Berziti

Middle Ages 

 old Žegligovo settlement established
 836-1018 under First Bulgarian Empire
 1018–1204 under 
 1020 Basil II in Kozjak established local episcopate from Archbishopric of Ohrid
 1071  St. George monastery built
 1094 Cumani tribe settled the area (It's believed the name Kumanovo came from this tribe)
 1207–1217 under 
 1313  Matejče Monastery built
 1346–1371 under 
 14th century  Karpino Monastery built
 1373–1395 under  Principality of Velbazhd

Ottoman Empire 

 (1395–1912) Kumanovo under Ottoman Empire
 1415  Halit Efendi Mosque built
 1463 under Sanjak of Skopje till 1912
 16th century  Karpino Monastery built
 1519 First time the name Kumanovo appears in documents
 1586/96  Kodza Mehmet Beg Mosque built
 1660 Evlija Celebi visits Kumanovo
 1689
Karposh's Rebellion
Kumanovo Fortress built
Selim I Giray retakes Kumanovo
 18th century Kumanovo Clock Tower built
 1751  Eski Mosque built
 1773  Jusuf Efendi Mosque built
 1805 Gavril Kratovac established the first school
 1810 population: 800 by: Gomera
 1833 Dimitrije Mladenovich established as Protoiereus
 1835 population: 5,000 by: Dupničanin
 1851 St. Nicholas church built
 1867 Kosovo Vilayet (Kumanovo Kaza) established (Vali Ibrahim Edhem Pasha)
 1873 Kumanovo is connected by rail with Solun
 1877 Kosovo Vilayet established
 1878  Kumanovo Uprising
 1885 population: 7,000 by: Bjankoni
 1894  IMRO organize a committee in Kumanovo in the house of Jordan Jovčev
 1899 Goce Delchev visits Kumanovo

1900–1912 

 1900 population: 14,530 by: Knčev
 1902 Holy Trinity church built
 1903 Vlach school established
 1904  Fight on Šuplji Kamen
 1905
  Fight in Tabanovce
  Fight on Čelopek
 1907 population: 15,000 by: Hadzi Vasiljevič

Balkan Wars 

 1912 Battle of Kumanovo  vs. 
 1913 under , see Treaty of London

First World War 

 1915,
 9 Oct 1915 – 24 Sep 1918 under , (Georgi Stojanov Todorov, Racho Petrov Stojanov, Stefan Toshev Toshev)
 Ovče Pole Offensive
 1918 under 
 1919 May 6, Boro Menkov birth

Kingdom of Yugoslavia 

 1920 FK Shparta established
 1921
 Gymnasium established
 Hristijan Todorovski Karpoš birth
 1922 October 14, Bajram Shabani birth
 1923 June 28, construction started of Sports Hall Sokolana
 1924  FK Kumanovo established
 1926
Electricity arrived
 Church St. Petka built
1928
 Lenche Kumanovche published
 1929
 9 Oct. Vardar Banovina established
 Kjira Manevich elected mayor
 1930 Zanaetchiski Dom established
 1931
Sports Hall Sokolana built
 Momchilo Jovanovski born
 1934
Two public execution in Kumanovo
Town Hospital established, gift from Nikola Spasich
 1937 Zebrnjak monument built

Second World War 

 1941
 8 Apr – 19 Apr, under  Nazi Germany (Georg Stumme)
 19 Apr 1941 – 7 Sep 1944 under  (Nikola Mihov Mikhailov, Anton Kozarov , Dimităr Raev, Toma Petrov)
 11 October  Anti-fascist insurrection started
 14 October Boro Menkov Killed in Action
 14 October Bajram Shabani Killed in Action
Dedo Ivan newspaper established
Oktobris newspaper established
 1944
 7 Sep – 12 Nov,  under  Nazi Germany (Heinz Scheurlen, Karl Hubert Lanz )
  February March
  Hristijan Todorovski Karpoš killed

Socialist Republic of Macedonia  

 1944  Zitomel company established
 1945
Krsto Lazarov Konjushki executed
Teodosiy Dzhartov executed
 Kumanovo Library established
  Tane Georgievski Library established
 Pobeda company established Later renamed CIK
 1946
 KIK company established
 KK Kumanovo established
 1947
 Jug Turist company established
 DIER company established later renamed "Dimche Erebica"
 Iskara company established
 FK Bashkimi established
 1948
  Theater Kumanovo established
  NAMA (or Naroden Magazin) company established
 Svetlina-Kumanovo company established
 Prosveta company established
Population: 20,242
 1951 Saltir Putinski elected mayor
 1952  FZC 11 Oktomvri company established
 1953
 Kozjak company established
Population: 23,339
 1954
 Tekstilpromet company established
 Bibrok company established
 Kiro Fetak company established
 Biserka company established
 11 Noemvri company established
1956  Lipkovo Dam completed
 1957
 Memorial Ossuary built
  Josip Broz Tito visit
 1958
  Diocese of Polog and Kumanovo established
 Kozhara-Kumanovo company established
 30 Juli company established
1959  Josip Broz Tito 2nd brief visit

 1960
 ZIK company established
 Nace Bugjoni high school established
 1961
 Nash Vesnik newspaper established
  Josip Broz Tito 3rd visit
 Population: 30,762
 1962  Monument to the Revolution built
 1963 Jezdimir Bogdanski elected mayor
 1964
 Boro Petrushevski – Papuchar tobacco company established
 Museum Kumanovo established
1965  Radio Kumanovo established
1967  Agro-Kumanovo company established
1970  Polet Company established
 1971
  Kiril Installed as Metropolitan bishop of DPK
 Population: 46,363
1972
 KIB company established
 Josip Broz Tito 4th visit
1974
House Museum of Hristijan Todorovski Karpoš established
  Metodi Petrovski elected mayor
1976  Pioners Home 29 Noemvri established
 1980
 Cultural Center Trajko Prokopiev  established
 Sports Hall Kumanovo built
 1981 Population: 60,842
 1982 Momchilo Jovanovski elected Mayor
 1986 Momchilo Jovanovski loses Mayor position

Macedonia 
 1990
  Blage Kiprijanovski elected Mayor
  Kumani established
 FK Milano established
 1993 TV Hana established
 1994
 RK Kumanovo reached the 1/8 finals at the EHF Cup Winners' Cup
Population: 65,233
 1996
  Boris Protikj elected Mayor
  Lipkovo,  Staro Nagoričane, Orašac and Klečovce seceded from Kumanovo and became Municipalities
1997 Matejche Mosque built
 1998
Days of Comedy theater festival established
 Dragan Bogdanovski dies
 1999  Kumanovo Agreement signed

21st century

2000s 
 2000
  Slobodan Kovachevski elected Mayor
  St. George church built
 2001
  Albanian insurgency
  Operation MH – 2
  Operation Vaksince
 Kumanovo Water Crisis
  Kokino discovered
 Orthodox cemetery desecrated in v. Opae
 2002
  Gymnasium bombing
 Radio Bravo established
 KK Kumanovo reached the play-off final in the Macedonian First League
 Football player Stefan Tolevski (age 23) dies while playing a game on Gradski Stadium Kumanovo
 population: 70,842
 2003
 Euro College established
 2004
 Daniel Markovski participated and came as runner up at the MRT reality TV show "Toa Sum Jas"
 ASNOM Memorial Center built
 Municipality of Orashec merged with Kumanovo Municipality
 Romeo Zhivikj Roki killed
 2005
  Zoran Damjanovski elected Mayor (first term)
 Goran Georgievski Mujo killed
 Sasho Dimitrievski killed
 New Mosque built
 FC Bashkimi made it to the Q2 of UEFA Cup first time for a team from Kumanovo
 2006
  Church of St. George built
 Josip Broz Tito Monument built
2008
  Consecration of the newly built Cross in Kosmatac
  Bajrush Gang arrested
  established
 2009
  Zoran Damjanovski elected Mayor (second term)
 Faculty of Business Administration established

2010s 

 2010
 Hadzi Shefket Mosque built
 2011
 Romanian Embassy in Macedonia established Aliriza Osmani as Honorary council of Romania in Kumanovo
 2012
 KK Kumanovo started to compete for the first time in the regional BIBL League
 FK Goblen established
 2013
 Kiril of Polog and Kumanovo dies, Diocese of Polog and Kumanovo dissolved, Diocese of Kumanovo and Osogovo established, Joseph Installed as Metropolitan bishop of the DKO
 Ploshtad newspaper established
  Zoran Damjanovski elected Mayor (third term)
  Kumanovo religious attacks
2014
 Start of Rehabilitation of Section Kumanovo – Beljakovce, Railway Corridor VIII
  Nezim Gang arrested
  Church St. Archangel Michael built
 Police Station Bombing
 Listeriosis outbreak
 2015
 K3 TV established
 TV Plus established
Church of Resurrection of Christ  built
  Goshince attack
  Kumanovo shootings
 KK Kumanovo started to compete for the first time in the newly formed FIBA Europe Cup
Consecration of the church of Holy Martyr Cyriaca in Zubovce
Orthodox Church Ascension of Christ built in Dolno Kojnare
 Consecration of the church of St Nicholas the Wonderworker in Umin Dol
 Kosturnik and Voinovikj villages established
 Darko "Spejko" Petkovski won regional Big Brother
2016
  Office of "Association of Macedonian-Bulgarian friendship" established
 8 Police officers posthumously awarded with Medal of Bravery
 10th annual "Gymnasiade 2016" was held in Kumanovo
  Olympiacos F.C. Fans attack on Lukoil Gas Station in Kumanovo
 Consecration of Orthodox Church of Ascension of Christ built in the village of Pcinja
 Consecration of Orthodox Church of Ascension of Christ in the village of Dolno Konjare
 Consecration of Orthodox Church of the Most Holy Theotokos in Studena Bara
 Public swimming pool Kumanovo established
 Momchilo Jovanovski dies
2017
 Christmas procession for the first time in Kumanovo

See also 
List of mayors of Kumanovo
List of Metropolitans of Diocese of Kumanovo and Osogovo
Timeline of Skopje

References 

Kumanovo
History of Macedonia (region)